The West Indies cricket team toured New Zealand between December 1999 and January 2000, playing two Test matches and five One Day International (ODI) games.

Warm-up games preceded the Test series. The West Indies played against the New Zealand Max Blacks on December 3, losing the game. They then faced New Zealand 'A' on December 5, and Auckland on December 10, with both matches drawn. The first Test match began on December 16, with the West Indies following their first innings score of 365 - featuring centuries by openers Adrian Griffith and Sherwin Campbell - with 97 all out thanks to a seven-wicket haul by Chris Cairns. Former West Indian fast-bowler criticised the West Indian performance as "second rate." Cairns finished the two-Test series with 17 wickets at a bowling average of 9.94.

New Zealand proceeded to reach 518 in the first innings of the second Test with Mathew Sinclair scoring a double-century, and the West Indies batted twice for 179 and 243, losing by an innings and 105 runs. The home team went on to win the ODI series 5:0. The first match was rain-affected, with New Zealand taking a three-wicket victory on Duckworth Lewis. Victory margins of seven wickets, four wickets, eight wickets and twenty runs followed in the remaining four games. Nathan Astle scored 320 across the series, with four half-centuries, while Daniel Vettori took nine wickets.

Test series summary

First Test

Second Test

One Day Internationals (ODIs)

1st ODI

2nd ODI

3rd ODI

4th ODI

5th ODI

References
Notes

Sources
 West Indies in New Zealand, Dec 1999 - Jan 2000 from ESPNcricinfo.

1999 in West Indian cricket
2000 in West Indian cricket
1999 in New Zealand cricket
2000 in New Zealand cricket
International cricket competitions from 1997–98 to 2000
New Zealand cricket seasons from 1970–71 to 1999–2000
1999